Pipers Hole River Provincial Park was a provincial park situated near Swift Current, Newfoundland and Labrador.  The park was privatized in 1995 as a cost-cutting initiative by the provincial government.  Between 1995 and 2008 the new owner failed and abandoned the property, and the park is no longer operating and is no longer a protected area under provincial jurisdiction.

References

Provincial parks of Newfoundland and Labrador